Class A, also known as Single-A and sometimes as Low-A, is the fourth-highest level of play in Minor League Baseball in the United States, below Triple-A, Double-A, and High-A. There are 30 teams classified at the Single-A level, one for each team in Major League Baseball (MLB), organized into three leagues: the California League, Carolina League, and Florida State League.

History
Class A was originally the highest level of Minor League Baseball, beginning with the earliest classifications, established circa 1890. Teams within leagues at this level had their players' contracts protected and the players were subject to reserve clauses. When the National Association of Professional Baseball Leagues – the formal name of Minor League Baseball – was founded in 1901, Class A remained the highest level, restricted to leagues with cities that had an aggregate population of over a million people. Entering the 1902 season, the only Class A leagues were the Eastern League and the Western League—both leagues had eight teams, in cities such as Toronto, Ontario; Buffalo, New York; Worcester, Massachusetts; Omaha, Nebraska; Denver, Colorado; and Peoria, Illinois. Leagues operating within less populated areas were classified as Class B, Class C, or Class D.

Class A remained the top classification until Class AA was established in 1912, then remained the second-highest classification until Class A1 was established in 1936. In 1946, the top two levels changed from being Class AA and Class A1 to being Class AAA and AA, with Class A remaining the third-highest  level, above Classes B through D. Class A in 1946 consisted of the Eastern League and the original South Atlantic League (or "Sally League"), with teams in communities such as Vancouver, British Columbia; Omaha, Nebraska; Colorado Springs, Colorado; Charlotte, North Carolina; Scranton, Pennsylvania; and Allentown, Pennsylvania. Class A soon included the Western League (1947–1958), Central League (1948–1951) and Western International League (1952–1954). The Western International League became the Class B Northwest League in 1955, and the Western and Central loops folded.

The hierarchy of Triple-A through Class D continued until Minor League Baseball restructured in 1963, at which time Classes B through D were abolished, with existing leagues at those levels reassigned into Class A, while the South Atlantic League (renamed as the Southern League) and Eastern League ascended to Double-A.

In 1965, a Class A Short Season designation was created, for teams playing June–September schedules, primarily meant for new players acquired via the amateur draft. The Class A-Advanced designation was established in 1990, between Class A and Double-A in the minor league hierarchy. Class A and Class A Short Season were considered independent classifications, with Class A having "Full-Season" and Advanced sub-classifications, per the rules governing baseball's minor leagues. The overall hierarchy was:
 Triple-A
 Double-A
 Class A-Advanced
 Class A ("Full-Season A")
 Class A Short Season ("Short-Season A")
 Rookie league

Entering the 2020 minor league season (which was not played due to the COVID-19 pandemic), Class A consisted of the Midwest League and South Atlantic League (a newer "Sally League", which been formed in 1963 as the Western Carolinas League). Prior to the 2021 season, MLB restructured the minor leagues, eliminating Class A Short Season and discontinuing the use of all historical league names within Minor League Baseball. The Midwest League and South Atlantic League were reclassified as "High-A" leagues, and operated during 2021 as High-A Central and High-A East, respectively. They were replaced at the Class A level by three "Low-A" leagues: Low-A West, Low-A East, and Low-A Southeast. These leagues had historically been known as the California League, Carolina League, and Florida State League, respectively, and had previously operated at the Class A-Advanced level. These three leagues operated with Low-A naming for the 2021 season. Following MLB's acquisition of the rights to the names of the historical minor leagues, MLB announced on March 16, 2022, that the leagues would revert to their prior names, effective with the 2022 season. MLB also discontinued use of "Low-A" in favor of Single-A.

Current teams

Florida State League

Carolina League

California League

Playoffs

On June 30, 2021, Minor League Baseball announced that the top two teams in each league (based on full-season winning percentage, and regardless of division) would meet in a best-of-five postseason series to determine league champions.

References

External links
 

Minor league baseball
Carolina League
Florida State League
California League